Hampton Township is a township in Allegheny County, Pennsylvania, United States. The population was 18,470 at the 2020 census. It is a suburb of the Pittsburgh metropolitan area.

History
The first settlers of present-day Hampton Township in northern Allegheny County arrived in the mid to late 18th century around the time of the Revolutionary War. The town was called Tally Cavey. Hunters and fur trappers moved north of the Allegheny River in search of better game in the forests and more animals to capture and trade fur. In 1794, John McCaslin obtained a large section of land presently known as Oak Hill Farms near the junction of Route 8 and Mt. Royal Boulevard. Many geographical landmarks in the area bear the names of early settlers such as Robert and James Sample, William and Henry McCully, and John McNeal.

In 1861, Moses Hampton, LLD, a judge and member of Congress, signed the documents necessary to make Hampton into a municipality comprising parts of McCandless, Indiana, and West Deer townships. Throughout the late 19th to the 20th centuries, people slowly began to move into this area, eventually creating a bustling community of over 18,000 people.

Geography
Hampton Township is located at  (40.583096, -79.956583).

Communities
Allison Park
Elfinwild
Hardy
Pheasant Creek
Sample
Sutter Heights
Talley Cavey
Wildwood
Wyndham Gulch
Gibsonia

Surrounding neighborhoods
Hampton Township has five borders, including Richland Township to the north, West Deer Township to the northeast, Indiana Township to the east and southeast, Shaler Township to the south and McCandless to the west.

Demographics

At the 2000 census there were 17,526 people, 6,253 households, and 4,896 families living in the township. The population density was 1,092.8 people per square mile (421.9/km2). There were 6,627 housing units at an average density of 413.2 per square mile (159.5/km2).  The racial makeup of the township was 97.66% White, 0.67% African American, 0.05% Native American, 1.23% Asian, 0.01% Pacific Islander, 0.12% from other races, and 0.27% from two or more races. 0.53% of the population were Hispanic or Latino of any race.
There were 6,253 households, 38.5% had children under the age of 18 living with them, 68.8% were married couples living together, 7.1% had a female householder with no husband present, and 21.7% were non-families. 18.8% of households were made up of individuals, and 7.3% were one person aged 65 or older. The average household size was 2.76 and the average family size was 3.18.

The age distribution was 28.1% under the age of 18, 4.9% from 18 to 24, 27.6% from 25 to 44, 26.3% from 45 to 64, and 13.1% 65 or older. The median age was 40 years. For every 100 females there were 95.7 males. For every 100 females age 18 and over, there were 91.9 males.

The median household income was in the township was $80,911. The per capita income for the township was $41,074. About 0.2% of families and 1.6% of the population were below the poverty line, including 2.5% of those under age 18 and 6.7% of those age 65 or over.

Government and Politics

Hampton Township is governed by a five-member Township Council and an elected Controller.

Current elected officials:
 Carolynn Johnson, President
 Bethany Blackburn, Vice President
 Joseph Dougherty
 Julie Fritsch
 Richard "Rock" Kernick
 Jerry Speakman, Controller

Breakdown by Party and Term

[2022-2023] Democrats-4 (Johnson, Blackburn, Fritsch, Kernick), Republicans-2 (Dougherty, Speakman)

Education
The five schools (K-12) in the area are managed by the Hampton Township School District.

Elementary (K-5):
Wyland Elementary School, Central Elementary School, Poff Elementary School

Middle (6-8):
Hampton Middle School

High (9-12):
Hampton High School

References

External links
 Township of Hampton official website

Townships in Allegheny County, Pennsylvania